Salau Aliyev or Salau Aliev is a Kumyk nationalist and politician. In 1990, Aliyev was one of the founders of the Tenglik, or "Kumyk Peoples' Party". Aliyev believes that the Kumyks are descended from the medieval Khazars and cites the Khazar Khaganate and the later Shamkhalate of Tarki as inspiring his vision of a Kumyk-dominated, independent Dagestan. His critics contend that such a state would be ruled by a minority of its population.

References
Yoav Karny. Highlanders: A Journey to the Caucasus in Quest of Memory. New York: Farrar Straus and Giroux, 1999.

People from Makhachkala
Russian politicians
Living people
Year of birth missing (living people)